Loxofidonia is a genus of moths in the family Geometridae described by Packard in 1876.

Loxofidonia acidaliata (Packard, 1874)
Loxofidonia cingala Moore, 1887

References

Xanthorhoini